Notopteris (long-tailed blossom bat) is a genus of megabat in the family Pteropodidae. It contains the following species:

 Long-tailed fruit bat, Notopteris macdonaldi (Fiji and Vanuatu)
 New Caledonia blossom bat, Notopteris neocaledonica (New Caledonia)

References

 
Bat genera
Taxa named by John Edward Gray
Taxonomy articles created by Polbot